"Slav’sya!", is the name of the final song in the epilogue of Mikhail Glinka's first opera A Life for the Tsar (1836) and now considered as one of Russia's greatest classical and patriotic anthems of the 19th century. 

The original version of the song, written by Vasily Zhukovsky and Egor Fyodorovich Rozen, praised the Tsar and the Russian Tsardom, while the latter version by Sergey Gorodetsky was one of a patriotic form and is even sometimes regarded as a patriotic anthem of the Russia in the 20th century and today. It is one of the more popular pieces from the opera, which is performed during patriotic concerts by orchestras and traditional Russian and Soviet instrumental ensembles. 

It has also been played by military bands and civil concert bands, using the arrangement composed by military composer Yevgeny Makarov for the Moscow Victory Parade of 1945 after World War II, and was also arranged for the Alexandrov Ensemble, which played it during their 2004 concert in the Vatican. While the modern version is the more commonly known version sung today, there have been also performances in which the original Imperial lyrics have been sung.

Lyrics of the original Imperial version

Variant 1
Славься, славься, нашъ русскiй Царь!
Господомъ данный намъ Царь-Государь!
Да будетъ безсмертенъ твой Царскiй родъ,
Да имъ благоденствуетъ русскiй народъ.

Славься, славься ты, Русь моя,
Славься ты, русская наша земля.
Да будетъ во вѣки вѣковъ сильна
Любимая наша родная страна.

Славься, славься изъ рода въ родъ,
Славься, великiй нашъ русскiй народъ.
Враговъ, посягнувшихъ на край родной,
Рази безпощадной могучей рукой.

Славься, славься, родная Москва,
Родины нашей, страны голова.
Живи, возвышайся на радость намъ,
На счастье народовъ, на гибель врагамъ.

Слава, слава героямъ-бойцамъ,
Родины нашей отважнымъ сынамъ.
Кто кровь за Отчизну свою прольетъ,
Того никогда не забудетъ народъ.

Слава, слава, греми, Москва!
Празднуй торжественный день Государя,
Ликуй, веселися: твой Царь грядетъ!
Царя-Государя встрѣчаетъ народъ.

Слава, слава нашему Царю!
Слава, слава земле родной!
Слава героямъ Руси Святой!
Ура! ура! ура!

Public performance lyrics

Lyrics of the post-Imperial version 
Performance lyrics of abbreviated version as sung by the Alexandrov Ensemble:

Version 1

Version 2

Version 3

Use in other songs
In 2015, Oleg Gazmanov released his single, Vperyod – Rossiya! ("Forward – Russia!") and samples the first lines of Slavsya.

References 

1836 songs
Compositions by Mikhail Glinka
Choral compositions
Russian patriotic songs